British 46th Infantry Division may refer to:
 46th (North Midland) Division a 1st Line Territorial Force division in World War I
 46th Infantry Division (United Kingdom) a 2nd Line Territorial Army division in World War II